Justin Neville Norris (born 4 June 1980) is an Australian butterfly and individual medley swimmer who won the bronze medal in the 200 metres butterfly at the 2000 Summer Olympics in Sydney, Australia.

Early life
Coming from Stockton, New South Wales, Norris relocated to the Australian Institute of Sport, Canberra in 1999 after being awarded a scholarship. He subsequently gained selection for Australia at the 1999 Pan Pacific Championships in Sydney.

Swimming career
At his first Olympics in Sydney, Norris made a poor start, missing the final of the 400-metre individual medley.  However, he qualified for the final of the 200-metre butterfly, where he was considered an outsider. Norris attacked from the start, contesting the lead over the first 100-metre. Willed on by a partisan home crowd, he managed to hang on to the third position as the favourites surged for the finish line.  While being interviewed on the pool deck, a bewildered Norris repeatedly used what has become his winning catchphrase – "I'm stoked."

In 2001, Norris claimed another bronze medal at the 2001 FINA World Championships in Fukuoka, Japan, this time in the 200-metre individual medley, and in 2002 collected triple gold in the 200-metre and 400-metre individual medley and the 200-metre butterfly at the 2002 Commonwealth Games in Manchester.  However, in 2003, he had no success in his three events, failing to medal at the 2003 FINA World Championships in Barcelona, Spain. He fared even worse at the 2004 Summer Olympics in Athens, failing to reach a single final.

Later life
Justin now also manages multiple popular YouTube channels with his wife Brooke, following the life his family "The Norris Nuts", originally started to document his daughter, Sabre Norris, and her athletic achievements.

See also
 List of Commonwealth Games medallists in swimming (men)
 List of Olympic medalists in swimming (men)

References

External links 
 Justin Norris Swim Academy
 The Norris Nuts

1980 births
Living people
Olympic swimmers of Australia
Australian male butterfly swimmers
Australian male medley swimmers
Swimmers at the 2000 Summer Olympics
Swimmers at the 2004 Summer Olympics
Olympic bronze medalists for Australia
Commonwealth Games gold medallists for Australia
Sportspeople from Newcastle, New South Wales
Olympic bronze medalists in swimming
World Aquatics Championships medalists in swimming
Australian Institute of Sport swimmers
Medalists at the FINA World Swimming Championships (25 m)
Medalists at the 2000 Summer Olympics
Commonwealth Games medallists in swimming
Swimmers at the 2002 Commonwealth Games
20th-century Australian people
21st-century Australian people
Medallists at the 2002 Commonwealth Games